Abacetus pomeroyi is a species of ground beetle in the subfamily Pterostichinae. It was described by Straneo in 1955.

References

pomeroyi
Beetles described in 1955